Suvainiškis is a small town in Panevėžys County, in northeastern Lithuania. According to the 2011 census, the town had a population of 175 people.

References

Towns in Lithuania
Towns in Panevėžys County